Jaakko Kunnas (30 August 1903 – 27 May 1986) was a Finnish gymnast. He competed at the 1924 Summer Olympics and the 1928 Summer Olympics.

References

External links
 

1903 births
1986 deaths
Finnish male artistic gymnasts
Olympic gymnasts of Finland
Gymnasts at the 1924 Summer Olympics
Gymnasts at the 1928 Summer Olympics
Sportspeople from Vyborg
20th-century Finnish people